Idiognophomyia is a genus of crane fly in the family Limoniidae.

Distribution
South Africa, Japan, Madagascar, China, & California.

Species
I. capicola (Alexander, 1934)
I. collata (Alexander, 1932)
I. comstocki (Alexander, 1947)
I. enniki Alexander, 1975
I. ignava (Alexander, 1920)
I. keiseri Alexander, 1963
I. laterospinosa (Alexander, 1928)
I. patula Alexander, 1960

References

Limoniidae
Nematocera genera
Diptera of Africa
Diptera of Asia
Diptera of North America